CPC Corporation is a state-owned petroleum, natural gas, and gasoline company in Taiwan and is the core of the Taiwanese petrochemicals industry.

History

Early history
CPC was founded on 1 June 1946 in Shanghai as Chinese Petroleum Corporation (中國石油) by the government of the Republic of China (ROC, then on Mainland China). With the Kuomintang's retreat to Taiwan after the Chinese Civil War, CPC was transferred from the Council of Resources to the Ministry of Economic Affairs. The company merged all relevant facilities and companies (Japanese 6th Naval Fuel Depot, Teikoku Oil, Nippon Oil, etc.) in Taiwan. Its main businesses include surveying, extracting, refining, transporting, and selling petroleum. It also produces various chemicals and has retail outlets all over Taiwan. CPC's fixing of petrol prices helped Taiwan through the 1970s Energy Crisis.

Democratization and modern history
Taiwan's petroleum industry was a CPC monopoly prior to June 1996. However, deregulation allowed the establishment of privately owned and operated petroleum refinery enterprises, leading to Formosa Plastics Group's launch of Formosa Petrochemical Corporation (台塑石化). In February 2007, the company's board approved name change to "CPC Corporation Taiwan" and the Chinese name from 中國石油 to 台灣中油. This was to avoid confusion with PetroChina, the China state-run corporation which also has the Chinese name 中國石油, and was part of government efforts to desinicize Taiwanese entities which have "China" in their names.  However, the Kuomintang political party argued that the name change is not valid because no legislation was passed in the legislature to support it. KMT believes that the approval of the Legislative Yuan is required before a state-owned company can change its name.

In December 2018, production started at the Prelude floating liquefied natural gas facility in Australia, which is the world's largest floating production structure. The company holds shares alongside investors Shell, Inpex Corporation, and Korea Gas Corporation.

In 2019 a Norwegian tanker named Front Altair carrying a cargo of naphtha for CPC Corporation was attacked in the Gulf of Oman. The entire NT$1.07b (US$34m) cargo was lost but the crew escaped unharmed and the cargo was insured. After insurance CPC Corporation incurred direct costs of NT$8m (US$254,000) associated with the incident. The cargo represented two days of Taiwanese consumption but had minimal impacts as the company had 45 day supply in reserve.

In 2020 the first shipment of carbon-neutral liquified-natural gas arrived at CPC's Yung-An LNG Terminal in Kaohsiung. The shipment was the first in a new program designed to render fuel imports carbon-neutral by buying carbon credits on the global market. The initial purchase from Shell Eastern Trading was for credits certified by the UN's REDD+ program which supports forests in developing countries.

In 2020 CPC saw the first shipment of crude from the Chadian Oryx field, CPC had first begun exploration in Chad in 2006.

Facilities 
In 2019 CPC announced the construction of a third LNG terminal, a facility in Taoyuan expected to be completed by 2023 with an initial capacity of 1 million tonnes per year (tpy).

In 2019 CPC received approval from the Environmental Protection Administration to construct a LNG terminal in Taichung.

Suppliers 
CPC Corporation was a historic buyer of Iranian oil and received a sanctions waiver from the United States when they imposed sanctions on Iranian oil imports. Despite receiving a sanctions waiver CPC Corporation chose to end its use of Iran as a source country.

In 2018 CPC signed an agreement with American Cheniere Energy to purchase liquefied natural gas for 25 years. Deliveries are set to begin in 2021.

Chairpersons
 Chen Chin-te (12 September 2016 - 18 August 2017)
 Yang Wei-fuu (30 August 2017 -) (acting)

See also

 CPC Corporation F.C.
 List of companies of Taiwan
 Economy of Taiwan
 Energy in Taiwan
 Ministry of Economic Affairs (Taiwan)
 Taiwan Power Company
 Taiwan Water Corporation

References

External links

CPC homepage

Chinese companies established in 1946
Energy companies established in 1946
Oil and gas companies of Taiwan
Chemical companies established in 1946
Non-renewable resource companies established in 1946
Government-owned companies of Taiwan
Companies based in Kaohsiung
National oil and gas companies